The Shore Line Trolley Museum is a trolley museum located in East Haven, Connecticut. Incorporated in 1945, it is the oldest continuously operating trolley museum in the United States. The museum includes exhibits on trolley history in the visitors' center and offers rides on restored trolleys along its  track as the Branford Electric Railway. In addition to trolleys, the museum also operates a small number of both trolleybuses and conventional buses.

The museum encompasses the Branford Electric Railway Historic District, which was added to the U.S. National Register of Historic Places in 1983.

History

The museum was incorporated in August 1945 as the Branford Electric Railway Association (BERA), a non-profit historical and educational institution. The Connecticut Company (or ConnCo), which operated most of the streetcar lines in the state of Connecticut, had been making plans since the early 1930s to abandon its "F" route, cutting it back in stages from its long-time terminus of Stony Creek until by April 1946 it ended in front of the post office in Short Beach, its original terminus when the line was opened for service on 31 July 1900. The last revenue car to operate under ConnCo auspices left Short Beach shortly after midnight on March 8, 1947, at which time BERA took possession of the remaining  portion of the line on private right-of-way between East Haven and Short Beach. Over the following year the museum moved virtually its entire collection at the time, including a number of just-retired ConnCo streetcars, onto its property via the existing and still-electrified track connection with Connecticut Company.

After ConnCo severed the track connection in 1948, BERA was on its own. The  line started out as double track but one of the tracks was torn up and sold for scrap to raise money. Eventually 20-year bonds were issued by the museum and its fortunes improved. In 1957 a new visitor's center, named for traction pioneer Frank Julian Sprague and known as Sprague Station, was built out of brick at the East Haven end of the line with help from funds donated by his widow.

Over the intervening years, BERA's collection has grown to become the third largest collection of electric railway equipment in North America, with a focus on equipment from Connecticut and New York City. It operates a variety of streetcars, rapid transit cars and work cars throughout the year. BERA currently does business as the Shore Line Trolley Museum which is run almost entirely by volunteers. Antique equipment is repaired and restored at the museum.

The collection also includes a small number of "trackless trolleys" (trolley buses) and motor buses (diesel- or gasoline-powered buses). In fall 2008, construction was started on a short trolley bus line, to allow the museum's trolley buses to operate. The first section was tested under power in April 2009 by 1947-built ACF-Brill trolley bus 205, which the museum acquired from the Philadelphia trolley bus system when it was retired from service by SEPTA in 1981. Construction of the line was about half completed as of September 2010 and due to continue in 2011. Regular operation – proposed to take place about once a month – is not expected to begin before 2012. The Shore Line Museum also owns two other trolley buses, ex-Philadelphia 210, identical to No. 205 (and acquired at the same time) and being used only as a source of parts, and ex-Massachusetts Bay Transportation Authority (Boston-area) 4037, a 1976 Flyer E800 which the museum acquired in 2009 and which is also able to operate on the line.

Highlights of the collection
Horsecar 76, thought to be the oldest preserved horse-drawn tram in the world.
New Orleans St. Charles Avenue Street car 850. It is one of the last three 800-series cars in existence. It was built by Perley Thomas in 1922.
Connecticut Company 500, the luxurious business/parlor car used by ConnCo
Manhattan Railway "G", the oldest preserved rapid transit car in the United States (built in 1878)
Interborough Rapid Transit 3344 "Mineola," the personal private car of August Belmont, Jr. (president of the IRT, which operated New York's first subway)
Ansonia Derby & Birmingham "Derby," the oldest surviving electric locomotive and the only Van De Poele motor preserved
Brooklyn and Queens Transit 1001, the first production PCC streetcar built
Third Avenue Railway System 220, the oldest operating streetcar in the United States (built in 1892)
Hudson and Manhattan 503, the only restored H&M "black car"
PATH PA3 745, Survived the collapse of the World Trade Center on 9/11
NYCTA R17 6688, Used in filming for The Amazing Spider-Man 2 movie
IND R9 1689, one of the original R1-9 subway cars used by the Independent Subway System

See also

National Register of Historic Places listings in New Haven County, Connecticut

Footnotes

References

External links

Shore Line Trolley Museum

East Haven, Connecticut
Railroad museums in Connecticut
Museums in New Haven County, Connecticut
Heritage railroads in Connecticut
Streetcars in Connecticut
Street railway museums in the United States
National Register of Historic Places in New Haven County, Connecticut
Historic districts in New Haven County, Connecticut
Historic districts on the National Register of Historic Places in Connecticut